Carleton is a village in Thayer County, Nebraska, United States. The population was 94 at the 2020 census.

History
Carleton was established in 1872 when the railroad was extended to that point. It was named for Carleton B. Emory, the son of an early settler.

Geography
Carleton is located at  (40.302143, -97.676164).

Demographics

2010 census
As of the census of 2010, there were 91 people, 40 households, and 27 families residing in the village. The racial makeup of the village was 96.7% White, 1.1% African American, and 2.2% from two or more races.

There were 40 households, of which 25.0% had children under the age of 18 living with them, 55.0% were married couples living together, 10.0% had a female householder with no husband present, 2.5% had a male householder with no wife present, and 32.5% were non-families. 30.0% of all households were made up of individuals, and 20% had someone living alone who was 65 years of age or older. The average household size was 2.28 and the average family size was 2.52.

The median age in the village was 49.5 years. 22% of residents were under the age of 18; 1.1% were between the ages of 18 and 24; 19.8% were from 25 to 44; 33% were from 45 to 64; and 24.2% were 65 years of age or older. The gender makeup of the village was 48.4% male and 51.6% female.

2000 census
As of the census of 2000, there were 136 people, 54 households, and 38 families residing in the village. The population density was 278.9 people per square mile (107.2/km2). There were 57 housing units at an average density of 116.9 per square mile (44.9/km2). The racial makeup of the village was 100.00% White.

There were 54 households, out of which 29.6% had children under the age of 18 living with them, 64.8% were married couples living together, 1.9% had a female householder with no husband present, and 29.6% were non-families. 25.9% of all households were made up of individuals, and 11.1% had someone living alone who was 65 years of age or older. The average household size was 2.52 and the average family size was 3.08.

In the village, the population was spread out, with 27.9% under the age of 18, 2.2% from 18 to 24, 24.3% from 25 to 44, 28.7% from 45 to 64, and 16.9% who were 65 years of age or older. The median age was 40 years. For every 100 females, there were 106.1 males. For every 100 females age 18 and over, there were 104.2 males.

As of 2000 the median income for a household in the village was $38,125, and the median income for a family was $39,375. Males had a median income of $30,833 versus $16,875 for females. The per capita income for the village was $15,897. There were no families and 1.5% of the population living below the poverty line, including no under eighteens and none of those over 64.

Notable person
Roy Hitt, baseball player

References

Villages in Thayer County, Nebraska
Villages in Nebraska